Flavobacterium cucumis is a Gram-negative, rod-shaped and aerobic bacterium from the genus of Flavobacterium which has been isolated from greenhouse soil which was cultivated with cucumbers from Sangju in Korea.

References

 

cucumis
Bacteria described in 2007